The XIV Venice Challenge Save Cup was a professional tennis tournament played on clay courts. It was the 3rd edition of the men's tournament which was part of the 2016 ATP Challenger Tour. It took place in Mestre, Italy between 16 and 22 May 2016.

Singles main-draw entrants

Seeds

1 Rankings as of May 9, 2016.

Other entrants
The following players received wildcards into the singles main draw:
  Edoardo Eremin
  Gianluca Mager
  Stefano Napolitano
  Lorenzo Sonego

The following player entered the main draw as an alternate:
  Gastão Elias

The following players received entry from the qualifying draw:
  Nicolás Jarry 
  Marek Michalička 
  Daniel Masur
  Danilo Petrović

Champions

Singles

 Gastão Elias def.  Horacio Zeballos, 7–6(7–0), 6–2

Doubles

 Fabrício Neis /  Caio Zampieri def.  Kevin Krawietz /  Dino Marcan, 7–6(7–3), 4–6, [12–10]

External links
 Official website

Venice Challenge Save Cup
Venice Challenge Save Cup
May 2016 sports events in Italy